The Ambassador Extraordinary and Plenipotentiary of the Russian Federation to the Kingdom of Thailand is the official representative of the President and the Government of the Russian Federation to the Prime Minister and the Government of Thailand.

The ambassador and his staff work at large in the Embassy of Russia in Bangkok. The ambassador to Thailand is concurrently appointed as the Russian representative to the United Nations Economic and Social Commission for Asia and the Pacific.

History of diplomatic relations

Contacts between the Russian Empire and the Kingdom of Siam began in the early 1860s. On 19 February 1863 the Imperial Russian Navy warships  and  anchored at the port of Bangkok. Siam was also one of the countries visited by explorer Nicholas Miklouho-Maclay, in 1876 and 1877, during his visits to the Asia-Pacific region. Relations between the two countries were particularly strong during the later nineteenth century, with Russia supporting Siam's independence in the face of European colonial expansion. Russia dispatched a naval squadron under Rear-Admiral Avraamy Aslanbegov to represent it at the centennial celebrations of the Chakri dynasty in 1882. There were royal visits between the two countries over the following years, and at the visit of King Chulalongkorn to Emperor Nicholas II in July 1897, diplomatic relations were formalised. On 4 December 1897  was appointed Minister-Resident, and the consulate general of Russia was opened in Bangkok on 14 April 1898.

Relations were warm into the early twentieth century, until the Russian Revolution in 1917 brought an end to the Russian Empire. Diplomatic relations were maintained during the brief period of the Russian Provisional Government, but ended after the October Revolution brought the Bolsheviks to power. Relations between the Soviet Union and Siam were established on 12 March 1941, with the two states agreeing to exchange diplomatic missions in 1947.  was appointed as Soviet representative, and the embassy in Bangkok was opened in 1948. After the dissolution of the Soviet Union in 1991 the Thai government recognized the Russian Federation as successor state of the USSR on 28 December 1991, and both countries have continued to exchange ambassadors.

List of representatives (1897 - present)

Representatives of the Russian Empire to the Kingdom of Siam (1897 – 1917)

Representatives of the Russian Provisional Government to the Kingdom of Siam (1917)

Representatives of the Soviet Union to Siam/Thailand (1947 - 1991)

Representatives of the Russian Federation to Thailand (1991 - present)

References

 
Thailand
Russia